The 2003 World Rowing Championships were World Rowing Championships that were held from 25 August to 1 September 2003 on the lake Idroscalo at Milan, Italy. The international rowing season usually ends with the World Championship regatta. Apart from the Olympic Games this is the most prestigious international rowing event, attracting over 1000 rowers.

Medal summary

Men's events
 Non-Olympic classes

Women's events
 Non-Olympic classes

Para 
Pararowing (or adaptive rowing) was for the second time included in rowing world championships in 2003.

Medal table

References

External links
World Championship medal winners

World Rowing Championships
W
Rowing
R
Rowing 2003
Rowing competitions in Italy
August 2003 sports events in Europe
September 2003 sports events in Europe
2000s in Milan